Galestown Cemetery is a cemetery located in Galestown, Maryland. One person of note interred there is Homer Smoot, a one-time professional baseball player.

Cemeteries in Maryland
Dorchester County, Maryland